Isomethadol is an opioid analgesic with a number of stereoisomers (viz. alpha and beta forms of dextro, laevo, and racemic isomers for a total of six) produced by the reduction of d,l-isomethadone with lithium aluminium hydride.  It was first produced in the United States in 1948.  The salt used in research is the hydrochloride.

References

Opioids